Swedes constitute a considerable ethnic group in Chicago, where a little over 15,000 people are of Swedish ancestry.

History
Like other European ethnic groups, people left Sweden in search of better economic opportunities during the mid-1800s.

In the year 1900, Chicago was the city with the second highest number of Swedes after Stockholm, the capital of Sweden. By then, Swedes in Chicago, most of whom settled in the Andersonville neighborhood, especially in the years following the Great Chicago Fire, had founded the Evangelical Covenant Church and established such enduring institutions as Swedish Covenant Hospital and North Park University. The fire destroyed much of the Swedish-American community, including four Swedish churches, and as many Swedish newspapers. Other Swedish neighborhoods included Lake View, which at its peak had about 20,000 Swedes.
In addition to Chicago, Swedish immigrants settled in Rockford and other parts of Illinois. 

Like other Swedish-American communities, the Chicago Swedes had their own newspaper, Hemlandet (Swedish for "The Homeland"). This paper was founded by Johan Alfred Enander, who argued that the Vikings were instrumental in enabling the "freedom" that spread not only throughout the British Isles, but America as well.

Many Chicago Swedes entered the construction business as part working their way up the economic ladder, though most started as carpenters and laborers. The Gust K. Newberg Construction company has emerged as one of Chicago's most prominent architectural firms. It is estimated that Swedes have been involved in building almost half the buildings in Chicago.

Today, Chicago is twinned with Gothenburg, Sweden, a testament to the longstanding connection between Sweden and the Greater Chicago Area.

Organizations in Chicago preserving Swedish heritage
The following places in Chicago have been founded by Swedes or to preserve Swedish heritage:
 Swedish American Museum Andersonville, Chicago, IL
 Swedish Covenant Hospital, Chicago, IL
 Swedish Club of Chicago

References

Further reading
 Anderson, Philip J. and Dag Blanck, eds. Swedish-American Life in Chicago: Cultural and Urban Aspects of an Immigrant People, 1850–1930 (1992)
 Beijbom, Ulf. Swedes in Chicago. A demographic and social study of the 1846-1880 immigration (1971) online
 Gustafson, Anita Olson. "'We hope to be able to do some good': Swedish-American women's organizations in Chicago." Swedish-American Historical Quarterly (2008) 59#4 pp 178–201; covers 1840 to 1950.
 Gustafson, Anita Olson. Swedish Chicago: The Shaping of an Immigrant Community, 1880–1920 (Northern Illinois University Press, 2018).
 Gustafson, Anita Olson. "North Park: Building a Swedish Community in Chicago." Journal of American Ethnic History (2003): 31-49. online

 Jackson, Erika K. Scandinavians in Chicago: The Origins of White Privilege in Modern America (University of Illinois Press, 2018).
 Naeseth, Henriette CK. "Drama in Swedish in Chicago." Journal of the Illinois State Historical Society (1948): 159-170. online

 Norén, Carol M. "On to Perfection: Nels O. Westergreen and the Swedish Methodist Church (2021) online
 Olson, Anita Ruth. "Swedish Chicago: The extension and transformation of an urban immigrant community, 1880-1920" (PhD dissertation, Northwestern University; ProQuest Dissertations Publishing, 1990. 9031971).
 Olson, Ernst Wilhelm. History of the Swedes of Illinois'' (3 vol 1908)online also see new reprint of old book
 Tsuchida, Eiko. "Science, technology, and Swedish-American identity: An immigrant acculturation in Chicago, 1890-1935" (PhD dissertation, University of Chicago; ProQuest Dissertations Publishing, 2014. 3615684).

 
Ethnic groups in Chicago